

A–O 

To find entries for A–O, use the table of contents above.

P 

 Pabst – Guido Frederico João Pabst (1914–1980)
 Paclt – Jiří Paclt (1925–2015)
 P.A.Collier – Philip A. Collier (fl. 2017)
 P.A.Cox – Paul Alan Cox (born 1953)
 Paczk. – Grazyna Paczkowska (born 1965)
 P.A.Dang. – Pierre Augustin Dangeard (1862–1947)
 Pagan – Francisco Mariano Pagan (1896–1942)
 P.A.Gilbert – Percy Albert Gilbert (1883–1960)
 Paine – John Alsop Paine (1840–1912)
 Painter – William Hunt Painter (1835–1910)
 Palassou – Pierre Bernard Palassou (1745–1830)
 Palez. – Philippe de Palézieux (1871–1957)
 Palib. – Ivan Vladimirovich Palibin (1872–1949)
 Pall. – Peter Simon von Pallas (1741–1811)
 Palla – Eduard Palla (1864–1922)
 Pallith. – Joseph Pallithanam (1915–1984)
 P.Allorge – Pierre Allorge (1891–1944)
 Palm – Björn Torvald Palm (1887–1956)
 Palmberg – Johannes Olai Palmberg (1640–1691)
 Palmer – Edward Palmer (1829–1911)
 Palmgr. – Alvar Palmgren (1880–1960)
 Pamp. – Renato Pampanini (1875–1949)
 Pamplin – William Pamplin (1806–1899)
 Pancher – Jean Armand Isidore Pancher (1814–1877)
 Pančić – Josif Pančić (1814–1888)
 Pandé – S. K. Pandé (1899–1960)
 Pandeir. – Mariana Sofia Pandeirada (born 1990)
 Pander – Heinz Christian Pander (1794–1865)
 Pando – Francisco Pando (born 1962)
 Panero – José L. Panero (born 1959)
 Panfet – Cristina Mercedes Panfet Valdés (born 1957)
 Pangalo – Konstantin Ivanovič Pangalo (1883–1965)
 Paniagua – Narel Y. Paniagua-Zambrana (born 1973) 
 Panigrahi – Gopinath Panigrahi (1924–2004)
 Panizzi – Francesco Panizzi (1817–1893)
 Panjutin – Platon Sergeevich Panjutin (1889–1946)
 Pankow – Helmut Pankow (1929–1996)
 Pannell – Caroline M. Pannell (fl. 1982)
 Panov – P. P. Panov (born 1932)
 Pansche – Adolf Pansche (1841–1887)
 Pant. – Jószef Pantocsek (1846–1916)
 Pantaz. – Andriana Pantazidou (born 1955)
 Panter – Jacqueline Anne Panter (born 1945)
 Panthaki – Dhun Phiroze Panthaki (born 1933)
 Pantl. – Robert Pantling (1856–1910)
 Panțu – Zacharia C. Panțu (1866–1934)
 Panz. – Georg Wolfgang Franz Panzer (1755–1829)
 Paol. – Giulio Paoletti (1865–1941)
 Papan. – Konstantinos Papanicolaou (born 1947)
 Pappe – Karl Wilhelm Ludwig Pappe (1803–1862)
 Parijs – J. P. Parijs
 Paris – Jean Édouard Gabriel Narcisse Paris (1827–1911)
 Parish – Samuel Bonsall Parish (1838–1928)
 Parkinson – Sydney Parkinson (–1771)
 Parl. – Filippo Parlatore (1816–1877)
 Parm. – Antoine Auguste Parmentier (1737–1813)
 Parn. – Richard Parnell (1810–1882)
 Parodi – Lorenzo Raimundo Parodi (1895–1966)
 Parr-Sm. – Geoffrey A. Parr-Smith (fl. 1984)
 Parry – Charles Christopher Parry (1823–1890)
 Pascher – Adolf Pascher (1881–1945)
 Pasq. – Giuseppe Antonio Pasquale (1820–1893)
 Pass. – Giovanni Passerini (1816–1893)
 Passarge – Otto Karl Siegfried Passarge (1867–1958)
 Passy – Antoine François Passy (1792–1873)
 Pasteur – Louis Pasteur (1822–1895)
 Pastore – Ada I. Pastore (1906–1952)
 Pat. – Narcisse Théophile Patouillard (1854–1926)
 Patel – M. K. Patel (fl. 1949)
 Paterson – William Paterson (1755–1810)
 Paton – Jean Annette Paton (born 1929) 
 Patraw – Pauline Mead Patraw (fl. 1936)
 Patrin – Eugène Louis Melchior Patrin (1742–1815)
 Patt. – Harry Norton Patterson (1853–1919) 
 Pau – Carlos Pau (1857–1937)
 Paul G.Wilson – Paul Graham Wilson (born 1928)
 Paulsen – Ove Paulsen (1874–1947)
 Paunero – Elena Paunero Ruiz (1906–2009)
 Paust – Susan Paust (born 1949)
 Pav. – José Antonio Pavón Jiménez (1754–1844)
 Pavlov – Nikolai Vasilievich Pavlov (1893–1971)
 Pavlova – Nina Mikhailovna Pavlova (1897–1973)
 Pavol. – Angiolo Ferdinando Pavolini (fl. 1908)
 Pawł. – Bogumił Pawłowski (1898–1971)
 Pax – Ferdinand Albin Pax (1858–1942)
 Paxton – Joseph Paxton (1803–1865)
 Payens – Joannes Petrus Dominicus Wilhelmus Payens (born 1928)
 Payson – Edwin Blake Payson (1893–1927)
 P.B.Adams – P. B. Adams (fl. 1978)
 P.Balzer – Peter Balzer (fl. 2011)
 P.Beauv. – Ambroise Marie François Joseph Palisot de Beauvois (1752–1820)
 P.Biju – Punnakot Biju (born 1975)
 P.Browne – Patrick Browne (1720–1790)
 P.Candargy – Paléologos C. Candargy (born 1870)
 P.C.Boyce – Peter Charles Boyce (born 1964)
 P.C.de Jong – Piet C. de Jong (fl. 1976)
 P.Chai – Paul P. K. Chai (fl. 1996)
 P.C.Kanjilal – Praphulla Chandra Kanjilal (1886–1972)
 P.C.Li – Pei Chun Li (fl. 1981)
 P.C.Pant – P. C. Pant (born 1936)
 P.Cruchet – Paul Cruchet (1875–1964)
 P.C.S.Kumar – P.C. Suresh Kumar (born 1953)
 P.Daniel – Pitchai Daniel (born 1943)
 P. de B. – Ambroise Marie François Joseph Palisot de Beauvois (1752–1820)
 P.de la Varde – Robert André Léopold Potier de la Varde (1878–1961)
 P.Delforge – Pierre Delforge (born 1945)
 P.D.Orton – Peter Darbishire Orton (1916–2005)
 P.D.Sell – Peter Derek Sell (1929-2013)
 P.D.Sørensen – Paul Davidson Sørensen (born 1934) 
 Pearl – Raymond Pearl (1879–1940)
 Pearse – Arthur Sperry Pearse (1877–1956)
 Pearson – William Henry Pearson (1849–1923)
 Pease – Arthur Stanley Pease (1881–1964)
 Peattie – Donald C. Peattie (1898–1964)
 P.E.Barnes – P.E. Barnes (fl. 1931)
 P.E.Berry – Paul Edward Berry (born 1952)
 Peck – Charles Horton Peck (1833–1917)
 Peckham – Ethel Anson Peckham (1879–1965)
 Peckoit – Gustav Peckoit (1861–1923)
 Peckolt – Theodor Peckolt (1822–1912)
 Pěčková – Milena Pěčková (fl. 1990)
 Peckover – Ralph Peckover (fl. 1992)
 Pedersen – Troels Myndel Pedersen (1916–2000)
 Pedley – Leslie Pedley (born 1930)
 Pedro – José Gomes Pedro (1915-2010)
 Peebles – Robert Hibbs Peebles (1900–1955)
 Peirce – George James Peirce (1868–1954)
 Pellegr. – François Pellegrin (1881–1965)
 Pelloe – Emily Harriet Pelloe (1878–1941)
 Pellow – Belinda Pellow (born 1956)
 Pelser – Pieter B. Pelser (fl. 2005)
 Penh. – David Pearce Penhallow (1854–1910)
 Penn. – Leigh Humboldt Pennington (1877–1929)
 Penneys – Darin S. Penneys (fl. 2004–2018)
 Pennant – Thomas Pennant (1726–1798)
 Pennell – Francis Whittier Pennell (1886–1952)
 Penny – George Penny (died 1838)
 Penz. – Albert Julius Otto Penzig (1856–1929)
 Pépin – Pierre Denis Pépin (c. 1802–1876)
 Perch-Nielsen – Katharina Perch-Nielsen
 Percival – John Percival (1863–1949)
 Perkins – Janet Russell Perkins (1853–1933)
 Perktold – Josef Anton Perktold (1804–1870)
 Perleb – Karl Julius Perleb (1794–1845)
 Perr. – George Samuel Perrottet (1793–1870)
 Perrie – Leon R. Perrie (fl. 2003)
 Perrier – Alfred Perrier (1809–1866)
 Perrine – Henry Perrine (1797–1840)
 Perry – Matthew Calbraith Perry (1794–1858)
 Pers. – Christiaan Hendrik Persoon (1761–1836)
 Perss. – Nathan Petter Herman Persson (1893–1978)
 Perty – Josef (Joseph) Anton Maximillian Perty (1804–1884)
 Peschkova – Galina A. Peschkova (born 1930)
 Petagna – Vincenzo Petagna (1734–1810)
 Pételot – Paul Alfred Pételot (1885–after 1940)
 Peter – (Gustav) Albert Peter (1853–1937)
 Peter B.Adams – Peter Barry Adams (fl. 1995)
 Peter G.Wilson – Peter Gordon Wilson (born 1950)
 Peterm. – Wilhelm Ludwig Petermann (1806–1855)
 Peters – Wilhelm Karl Hartwig Peters (1815–1883)
 Petoe – Peter Petoe (fl. 2018)
 Petr. – Franz Petrak (1886–1973)
 Petrie – Donald Petrie (1846–1926)
 Petrov – Vsevolod Alexeevič Petrov (1896–1955)
 Petrovič – Sava Petrovič (1839–1889)
 Petry – Arthur Petry (1858–1932) 
 Petz. – Carl Edward Adolph Petzold (1815–1891)
 Peyerimh. – Paul de Peyerimhoff de Fontenelle (1873–1957)
 Peyr. – Johann Joseph Peyritsch (1835–1889)
 Pfahl – Jay Charles Pfahl (born 1953)
 Pfeff. – Wilhelm Pfeffer (1845–1920)
 Pfeiff. – Louis (Ludwig) Karl Georg Pfeiffer (1805–1877)
 Pfeil – Friedrich Wilhelm Leopold Pfeil (1783–1859)
 Pfennig – Horst Pfennig (1933–1994)
 P.F.Hunt – Peter Francis Hunt (1936–2013)
 Pfiester – Lois Ann Pfiester (1936–1992)
 Pfitzer – Ernst Hugo Heinrich Pfitzer (1846–1906)
 P.F.Maycock – Paul F. Maycock (1930–2012)
 Pfosser – Martin Pfosser (fl. 2003)
 P.Fourn. – Paul Victor Fournier (1877–1964)
 P.F.Stevens – Peter F. Stevens (born 1944)
 P.Geissler – Patricia Geissler (1947–2000)
 P.G.Neish – Peter G. Neish (fl. 2000)
 P.H.Allen – Paul H. Allen (1911–1963)
 P.Halliday – Patricia Halliday (1930-2019)
 P.H.Davis – Peter Hadland Davis (1918–1992)
 P.Hein – Peter Hein (born 1962)
 P.H.Hô – Pham-Hoàng Hô (born 1931)
 Phil. – Rodolfo Amando Philippi (1808–1904)
 Philcox – David Philcox (1926–2003)
 Philippe – Xavier Philippe (1802–1866)
 Philipson – William Raymond Philipson (1911–1997)
 Phillippe – Loy R. Phillippe (fl. 1989)
 Phillipps – Anthea Phillipps (born 1956)
 Phipps – Constantine John Phipps (1744–1792)
 Phoebus – Philipp Phoebus (1804–1880)
 P.H.Raven – Peter Hamilton Raven (born 1936)
 Phukan – Sandhyajyoti Phukan (born 1950)
 P.H.Weston – Peter Henry Weston (born 1956)
 Pichon – Marcel Pichon (1921–1954)
 Pickering – Charles Pickering (1805–1878)
 Pickersgill – Barbara Pickersgill (born 1940)
 Pickett – Fermen Layton Pickett (1881–1940)
 Pickford – Grace Evelyn Pickford (1902–1986)
 Pic.Serm. – Rodolfo Emilio Giuseppe Pichi Sermolli (1912–2005)
 Pierrat – Dominique Pierrat (1820–1893)
 Pierre – Jean Baptiste Louis Pierre (1833–1905)
 P.I.Forst. – Paul Irwin Forster (born 1961)
 Pignatti – Sandro Pignatti (born 1930)
 Pigott – Donald Pigott (born 1928)
 Piippo – Sinikka Piippo (born 1955)
 Pilát – Albert Pilát (1903–1974)
 Pilg. – Robert Knud Friedrich Pilger (1876–1953)
 Pillans – Neville Stuart Pillans (1884–1964)
 Pilous – Zdeněk Pilous (1912–2000)
 P.I.Mao – Pin I Mao (born 1925)
 Pimentel – Reynold B. Pimentel (fl. 2017)
 Pimenov –  (born 1937)
 Pinchot – Gifford Pinchot (1865–1946)
 Piper – Charles Vancouver Piper (1867–1926)
 Pipoly – John J. Pipoly III (born 1955)
 Pirani – José Rubens Pirani (born 1958)
 Piré – Louis Alexandre Henri Joseph Piré (1827–1887)
 Pires – João Murça Pires (1916–1994)
 Pires-O'Brien – Maria Joaquina Pires-O'Brien (born 1953)
 Pirone – Pascal Pompey Pirone (1907–2003)
 Pirotta – Pietro Romualdo Pirotta (1853–1936)
 Pisano – Edmundo Pisano (1919–1997)
 Piso – Willem (Guilielmus, Guilherme) Piso (Pies) (1611–1678)
 Pit. – Charles-Joseph Marie Pitard (1873–1927)
 Pitcher – Zina Pitcher (1797–1872)
 Pittier – Henri François Pittier (1857–1950)
 P.J.Adey – Patricia J. Adey (born 1936)
 P.James – Peter Wilfred James (1930–2014)
 P.J.Bergius – Peter Jonas Bergius (1730–1790)
 P.J.Braun – Pierre Josef Braun (born 1959)
 P.J.Cribb – Phillip James Cribb (born 1946)
 P.J.Lang – Peter J. Lang (born 1955)
 P.J.L.Dang. – Pierre Jean Louis Dangeard (1895–1970)
 P.J.Müll. – Philipp Jakob Müller (1832–1889)
 P.J.Spence – Philip John Spence (born 1940)
 P.Karst. – Petter Adolf Karsten (1834–1917)
 P.K.Endress – Peter Karl Endress (born 1942)
 P.K.Holmgren – Patricia Kern Holmgren (born 1940)
 P.K.Hsiao – Pei Ken Hsiao (born 1931)
 P.K.Sarkar – Priyabrata K. Sarkar (born 1929)
 P.Kumm. – Paul Kummer (1834–1912)
 Planch. – Jules Émile Planchon (1823–1888)
 Planchuelo – Ana María Planchuelo (born 1944)
 Playford – Geoffrey Playford (fl. 1981)
 Plaz – Anton Wilhelm Plaz (1708–1784)
 Plée – Auguste Plée (1787–1825)
 Plowman – Timothy Charles Plowman (1944–1989)
 Plowr. – Charles Bagge Plowright (1849–1910)
 P.L.Perry – Pauline Lesley Perry (born 1927)
 Pluk. – Leonard Plukenet (1642–1706)
 Plum. – Charles Plumier (1646–1704)
 Plummer – Sara Allen Plummer (1836–1923)
 Plumst. – Edna Pauline Plumstead (1903–1989)
 P.MacGill. – Paul Howard MacGillivray (1834–1895)
 P.Martin – Paul Martin (1923–1982)
 P.M.Gilmour – Phil M. Gilmour (fl. 1987)
 P.Morris – Patrick Francis Morris (1896–1974)
 P.N.Fraser – Patrick Neill Fraser (1830–1905)
 P.N.Johnson – Peter Nevill Johnson (born 1946)
 Pobed. – Evgeniia (Eugenia) Georgievna Pobedimova (1898–1973)
 P.O'Byrne – Peter O'Byrne (1955–2018)
 Pocock – Mary Agard Pocock (1886–1977)
 Pócs – Tamás Pócs (born 1933)
 Podger – Francis Denis Podger (born 1933)
 Podp. – Josef Podpera (1878–1954)
 Poederlé – Eugene Josef Charles Gilain Hubert d'Olmen Poederlé (1742–1813)
 Poelln. – Karl von Poellnitz (1896–1945)
 Poelt – Josef Poelt (1924–1995)
 Poepp. – Eduard Friedrich Poeppig (1798–1868)
 Poggenb. – Justus Ferdinand Poggenburg I (1840–1893)
 Pohl – Johann Baptist Emanuel Pohl (1782–1834)
 Pohle – Christian Nikolai Richard Pohle (1869–1926)
 Poir. – Jean Louis Marie Poiret (1755–1834)
 Poiss. – Henri Louis Poisson (1877–1963)
 Poit. – Pierre Antoine Poiteau (1766–1854)
 Poivre – Pierre Poivre (1719–1786)
 Pojark. – Antonina Ivanovna Pojarkova (1897–1980)
 P.O.Karis – Per Ola Karis (born 1955)
 Pokle – Dileep Sadashivrao Pokle (born 1950)
 Pokorny – Alois (or Aloys) Pokorny (1826–1886)
 Polatschek – Adolf Polatschek (born 1932)
 Pole-Evans – Illtyd (Iltyd) Buller Pole-Evans (1879–1968)
 Poljakov – Petr Petrovich Poljakov (1902–1974)
 Pollard – Charles Louis Pollard (1872–1945)
 Pollexf. – John Hutton Pollexfen (1813–1899)
 Pollich – Johan Adam Pollich (1740–1780)
 Pollock – James Barkley Pollock (1863–1934)
 Polunin – Nicholas Vladimir Polunin (1909–1997)
 Pomel – Auguste Pomel (1821–1898)
 Poole – Alick Lindsay Poole (1908–2008)
 Popl. – Henrietta Ippolitovna Poplavskaja (1885–1956)
 Popov – Mikhail Grigoríevič Popov (1893–1955)
 Poppelw. – Dugald Louis Poppelwell (1863–1939)
 Porcius – Florian Porcius (1816–1907)
 Porteners – M.F. Porteners (fl. 1990)
 Porter – Thomas Conrad Porter (1822–1901)
 Porto – Paulo Campos Porto (1889–1968)
 Poselg. – Heinrich Poselger (1818–1883)
 Posp. – Eduard Pospichal (1838–1905)
 Post – George Edward Post (1838–1909)
 Potter – Michael Cressé Potter (1859–1948) 
 Potonié – Henry Potonié (1857–1913)
 Pourr. – Pierre André Pourret (1754–1818)
 Pouzolz – Pierre Marie Casimir de Pouzolz (1785–1858)
 P.Parm. – Paul Évariste Parmentier (1860–1941)
 P.Petit – Paul Charles Mirbel Petit (1834–1913)
 Prada – María del Carmen Isabel Prada (born 1953)
 Pradal – Émile Pradal (1795–1874)
 Pradeep – Ayilliath K. Pradeep (fl. 1990)
 Pradhan – Udai Chandra Pradhan (born 1949)
 Praeger – Robert Lloyd Praeger (1865–1953)
 Praet. – Ignaz Praetorius (1836–1908)
 Prag. – Ernst Prager (1866–1913)
 Prahl – Peter Prahl (1843–1911)
 Prain – David Prain (1857–1944)
 Prak.Rao – Chellapilla Surya Prakasa Rao (born 1917)
 Pramanik – B. B. Pramanik (born 1933)
 P.Ramesh – Polluri Ramesh (fl. 1997)
 Prance – Ghillean Tolmie Prance (born 1937)
 Prantl – Karl Anton Eugen Prantl (1849–1893)
 Prassler – Maria Prassler (born 1938)
 Prát – Silvestr Prát (1895–1990)
 Prather – L. Alan Prather (born 1965)
 Pratt – Anne Pratt (1806–1893)
 Pray – Thomas Richard Pray (born 1923)
 Preble – Edward Alexander Preble (1871–1957)
 Preiss – Balthazar Preiss (1765–1850)
 Prill. – Édouard Ernest Prillieux (1829–1915)
 Primavesi – Anthony Leo Primavesi (1917–2011)
 Pringle – Cyrus Pringle (1838–1911)
 Pringsh. – Nathanael Pringsheim (1823–1894)
 Prior — Richard Chandler Alexander Prior (1809–1902)
 Priszter – Szaniszló Priszter (1917–2011)
 Pritz. – George August Pritzel (1815–1874)
 Priyankara – Theja Priyankara (fl. 2020)
 P.R.O.Bally – Peter René Oscar Bally (1895–1980)
 Prober – Suzanne Mary Prober (born 1964)
 Proctor – George Richardson Proctor (1920–2015)
 Prodan – Iuliu Prodan (1875–1959)
 Profice – Sheila Regina Profice (born 1948)
 Prokh. – Jaroslav Ivanovic Prokhanov (1902–1964)
 Prosk. – Johannes Max Proskauer (1923–1970)
 Prowazek – Stanislaus von Prowazek (1875–1915)
 P.Royen – Pieter van Royen (1923–2002)
 P.Rubtzoff – [[Peter Rubtzoff (1920–1995) 
 Pryer – Kathleen M. Pryer (fl. 1989)
 P.Sarasin – Paul Benedict Sarasin (1856–1929)
 P.S.Ashton – Peter Shaw Ashton (born 1934)
 P.Schneid. – Peter Schneider (1936–1989)
 P.Selby – Prideaux John Selby (1788–1867)
 P.S.Green – Peter Shaw Green (1920–2009)
 P.Silva – António Rodrigo Pinto da Silva (1912–1992)
 P.S.Liu – Pei Song Liu (fl. 1984)
 P.S.N.Rao – P. Satyanarayana Rao (born 1949)
 P.S.Short – Philip Sydney Short (born 1955)
 P.S.Soltis – Pamela S. Soltis (fl. 2007)
 P.Stark – Peter Stark (1888–1932)
 P.S.Wyse Jacks. – Peter Wyse Jackson (born 1955)
 P.Syd. – Paul Sydow (1851–1925) (father of Hans Sydow)
 P.Taylor – Peter Geoffrey Taylor (1926–2011)
 P.Temple – Paul Temple (fl. 2008)
 P.T.Ong – Poh Teck Ong (fl. 2009)
 P.T.Li – Ping Tao Li (born 1936)
 Puente-Lel. – Caroline Puente-Lelievre (fl. 2012)
 Puget – François Puget (1829–1880)
 Pugsley – Herbert William Pugsley (1868–1947)
 Pujals – Carmen Pujals (1916–2003)
 Pulle – August Adriaan Pulle (1878–1955)
 Pult. – Richard Pulteney (1730–1801)
 Purchas – William Henry Purchas (1823–1903)
 Purdie – William Purdie (c.1817–1857)
 Purdom – William Purdom (1880–1921)
 Purk. – Emanuel von Purkyně (1832–1882)
 Purpus – Carl Albert Purpus (1851–1941)
 Pursell – Ronald Arling Pursell (1930–2014)
 Pursh – Frederick Traugott Pursh (1774–1820)
 Purton – Thomas Purton (1768–1833)
 Puspit. – Dwi Murti Puspitaningtyas (fl. 2005)
 Putnam – George Palmer Putnam (1887–1950)
 Putt. – Alois (Aloys) Putterlick (1810–1845)
 Puttock – Christopher Francis Puttock (born 1954)
 Putz. – Jules Putzeys (1809–1882)
 P.V.Heath – Paul V. Heath (born 1950)
 P.Watson – Peter William Watson (1761–1830)
 P.W.Ball – Peter William Ball (born 1932)
 P.Wilkie – Peter Wilkie (fl. 1999)
 P.Wilson – P.Wilson (1879–1944)
 P.Woods – Patrick James Blythe Woods (1932–2004)
 P.Y.Chen – Pang Yu Chen (born 1936)
 Pynaert – Edouard-Christophe Pynaert (1835–1900)

Q–Z 

To find entries for Q–Z, use the table of contents above.

 
1